Tangled Tales   is an album by Dan Hicks, released on March 24, 2009, on Surfdog Records. It was recorded along with Hicks' longtime band, billed as "His Hot Licks". It consists of two new songs, as well as reworkings of Hicks' older originals and several covers. The title track consists entirely of scatting, and was suggested by the owner of Surf Dog Records.

Track listing
All tracks composed by Dan Hicks; except where indicated.
 "Who Are You?"
 "The Diplomat"
 "Savin' My Lovin'"
 "The Blues My Naughty Baby Gave to Me" (Arthur N. Swanstone, C. Morgan, Charles R. McCarron)
 "Song for My Father" (Horace Silver, Ellen May Shashoyan)
 "The Rounder"
 "13-D"
 "Ragtime Cowboy Joe" (Grant Clark, Lewis F. Muir, Maurice Abrahams)
 "A Magician"
 "Subterranean Homesick Blues" (Bob Dylan)
 "Tangled Tales"
 "Let It Simmer!"

References

2009 albums
Bluegrass albums